Fort Wright, was an Army post located in the Round Valley of Mendocino County, about  s northwest of the present town of Covelo, California.  The principal duty of the garrison was to protect the Round Valley Indian Reservation's Indians from the intrusions, thefts and attacks of white settlers. From 1858, Federal troops had garrisoned the Round Valley Reservation until they were sent east in late 1861.

On October 28, 1862, Company F, 2nd California Volunteer Infantry Regiment, was ordered from Fort Gaston to Round Valley via Fort Humboldt and by ship to Fort Bragg.  Delays resulted in troops arriving there on December 11, 1862.

Commander
 Captain Charles D. Douglas, Second California Infantry, December 11, 1862 - June 1865

Garrisons
 Company F, 2nd Regiment California Volunteer Infantry, December 11, 1862 - June 1865
 Company A, 1st Battalion of Native Cavalry, California Volunteers, November 1864 - February 1865

Operations
 April 7–11, 1863.  Expedition from Fort Wright to Williams' Valley, California, with skirmish (Apr. 9th) in Williams' Valley.
 July 20–26, 1863. Operations in Round Valley, California

References

Fort Wright (California)
Closed installations of the United States Army
Wright, Fort
Wright
History of Mendocino County, California
1862 establishments in California